Cream is a configuration of the Vim text editor that consists of a set of scripts which can be run within Vim to make it behave more like an editor now common to most personal computers which conform to the Common User Access standards of interface and operability.

Through pulldown menus, keyboard shortcuts, and extensive editing functions, Cream tries to make Vim more approachable for novice users and adds features for those more experienced. These are provided through Vim's extensibility, without any special customizations to Vim itself.

Cream's name is a play on the idea of the coffee tamper: Both soften something stronger and more sophisticated, and neither can stand alone.

References

External links

Free text editors
Linux text editors
Windows text editors